The 2013 Miami Beach mayoral election took place on November 5, 2013, to elect the mayor of Miami Beach, Florida. The election was held concurrently with various other local elections, and was officially nonpartisan.  Philip Levine secured election with over 50% of the vote, avoiding a runoff.

References

External links
Mayor & Commissioner Home - miamibeachfl.gov
City of Clerk Elections @ City of Miami Beach

2013
2013 United States mayoral elections
2013 Florida elections